Dolenje Medvedje Selo is a small settlement on the northern outskirts of Trebnje in eastern Slovenia. The area is part of the historical region of Lower Carniola and the Municipality of Trebnje is now included in the Southeast Slovenia Statistical Region.

References

External links
Dolenje Medvedje Selo at Geopedia

Populated places in the Municipality of Trebnje